Protomegabaria stapfiana is a species of Protomegabaria.

Phyllanthaceae
Plants described in 1910